Akademicheskaya (English: Academy's) is a station on the Moscow Metro's Kaluzhsko-Rizhskaya Line. It is named for the several Akademichesky Proyezd streets formerly located nearby, which were themselves named after the Russian Academy of Sciences but have all been renamed since. Akademicheskaya opened on October 13, 1962, and was designed by Yuliya Kolesnikova, Petukhova, and Fokina. Built to the relatively new pillar-trispan design (aka Sorokonozhka, centipede), which became prevalent in the 1960s due to its low construction costs.  The station has white marble pillars accented with a stripe of black marble near the top. The walls, originally faced with white tile with four horizontal blue stripes, were re-covered in 2003 with similarly coloured aluminium planes for a cleaner, more modern look.

The entrances to the station are located around Ho Chi Minh Square, at the intersection of Profsoyuznaya and Dmitriy Ulyanov streets. Currently the station serves 67,400 passengers daily.

In 2024, a transfer to Akademicheskaya on the Troitskaya line is planned.

Moscow Metro stations
Railway stations in Russia opened in 1962
Kaluzhsko-Rizhskaya Line
Railway stations located underground in Russia